"Halfway There" is a song by Dutch disc jockey and producer Tiësto and Canadian disc jockey and producer Dzeko with vocals from singer Lena Leon. It was released on 15 March 2019 in the Netherlands as a promotional single. The song is included in the Together EP.

Background and release 
The song was premiered by Tiësto during his performance at Tomorrowland 2018. He declared about the song : "It has a nice old-school, catchy melody and that’s why I love this so much!"

Track listing 
Digital Download (MF332)
 "Halfway There" – 4:11

Charts

References 

Tiësto songs
Songs written by Tiësto
2019 singles
2019 songs